Planar is an adjective meaning "relating to a plane (geometry)".

Planar may also refer to:

Science and technology
 Planar (computer graphics), computer graphics pixel information from several bitplanes
 Planar (transmission line technologies), transmission lines with flat conductors
 Planar, the structure resulting from the planar process used in the manufacture of semiconductor devices, such as planar transistors
 Planar graph, graph that can be drawn in the plane so that no edges cross
 Planar mechanism, a system of parts whose motion is constrained to a two-dimensional plane
 Planar Systems, an Oregon-headquartered manufacturer of digital displays
 Zeiss Planar, photographic lens designed by Paul Rudolph at Carl Zeiss in 1896

See also 
 List of planar symmetry groups
 Planarity, a computer puzzle game
 Plane (disambiguation)
 Planer (disambiguation)